As the Bell Rings is a Russian adaptation of the Disney Channel Italy Original Series Quelli dell'intervallo. It currently runs on Disney Channel (Russia), formerly Jetix (Russia) when it launched on August 10, 2010.

See also
As the Bell Rings, for other adaptations

References

External links 
 Official site

Russian children's television series
2010 Russian television series debuts
2012 Russian television series endings
2010s Russian television series
Disney Channels Worldwide original programming
2010s high school television series
2010s teen sitcoms
Television series about teenagers